The first USS Wilkes (TB-35) was a  in the United States Navy.

Built in New York 
Wilkes was laid down on 3 June 1899 at Morris Heights, New York, by the Gas Engine and Power Company and the Charles L. Seabury & Co.; launched on 28 September 1901; sponsored by Miss Harriet E. Rankin; and commissioned at the Norfolk Navy Yard on 18 September 1902, Lt. (jg.) Dudley Wright Knox in command.

U.S. Navy service 
Wilkes spent the bulk of her career in reserve. Soon after her commissioning, she was assigned to the Reserve Torpedo Flotilla based at Norfolk, Virginia. There, she remained until the winter of 1906 and 1907 when she briefly returned to full commission for service with the 3rd Torpedo Flotilla.

On 30 May 1907, she was again placed in reserve with the Reserve Torpedo Flotilla at Norfolk. There, she remained until 23 November 1908 when she was recommissioned and assigned to duty with the Atlantic Torpedo Fleet based at Charleston, South Carolina.

Decommissioning 
On 22 December 1909, she went back into reserve, this time at the Charleston Navy Yard. Apparently in commission, in reserve, while at Charleston, Wilkes was decommissioned there on 14 November 1913, and her name was struck from the Navy list on the following day. She was sunk as a target in the summer or fall of 1914.

References

Bibliography

External links

 

Torpedo boats of the United States Navy
Ships built in Morris Heights, Bronx
1901 ships